New Castle is an unincorporated community in Jefferson County, Alabama, United States. New Castle has a post office with ZIP code 35119. New Castle was formerly home to coal mines operated by John T. Milner.

References

Unincorporated communities in Jefferson County, Alabama
Unincorporated communities in Alabama